The 2011 Indonesian Futsal League (known as Specs Liga Futsal Indonesia V for sponsorship reason) is the 5th edition of Indonesian Futsal League (IFL), a nationwide futsal competition organized by the Football Association of Indonesia. This competition was scheduled to be held in 3 cities: Jakarta (Vidi Arena Pancoran & Tennis indoor GBK Stadium), Lampung (Saburai) and Palembang.

Participating clubs
Ten professional clubs will be participating in this competition.

Regular season table
 The first series held in Vidi Arena, Pancoran, Jakarta on 19–26 April 2011
 The second series held in Saburai Arena, Lampung on 31 May - 3 June 2011
 The third series held in Palembang, South Sumatra on 5–8 July 2011
 All times are Waktu Indonesia bagian Barat (WIB) – UTC+7

Updated to games played on 5 May 2011
(C) = Champion; (R) = Relegated; (P) = Promoted; (O) = Play-off winner; (A) = Advances to a further round.
Only applicable when the season is not finished:
(Q) = Qualified to the phase of tournament indicated; (TQ) = Qualified to tournament, but not yet to the particular phase indicated; (DQ) = Disqualified from tournament.

Final four
The knockout phase is scheduled on 22 July & 24 July 2011.

 All matches were played in Tennis Indoor Gelora Bung Karno Stadium, Senayan, Jakarta
 All times are Waktu Indonesia bagian Barat (WIB) – UTC+7

Semi-finals

Third Place

Final

References

External links
Official Website
Spirit Futsal not official site

Futsal in Indonesia
Indonesian Futsal League, 2011